Claudiu Mircea Cornaci (born 19 July 1975) is a Romanian former professional footballer who played as a left back or left midfielder for teams such as: Armătura Zalău, Dinamo București, Olimpia Satu Mare or Nyíregyháza Spartacus, among others. After retirement he started a football manager career and in 2018 obtained the UEFA A Licence.

Honours
Olimpia Satu Mare
Divizia B: 1997–98

Liberty Salonta
Divizia B: 2005–06

Nyíregyháza Spartacus
Nemzeti Bajnokság II: 2006–07

References

External links
 
 
 Claudiu Cornaci at magyarfutball.hu

1975 births
Living people
People from Zalău
Romanian footballers
Association football defenders
Association football midfielders
Liga I players
Liga II players
FC Dinamo București players
FC Olimpia Satu Mare players
FC Argeș Pitești players
CSM Ceahlăul Piatra Neamț players
ACF Gloria Bistrița players
CF Liberty Oradea players
FC Zalău players
Nemzeti Bajnokság I players
Nyíregyháza Spartacus FC players
Szolnoki MÁV FC footballers
Romanian expatriate footballers
Romanian expatriate sportspeople in Hungary
Expatriate footballers in Hungary
Romanian football managers